is a private junior college in Nantan, Kyoto, Japan, established in 1989.

External links
 Official website 

Japanese junior colleges
Educational institutions established in 1989
Private universities and colleges in Japan
Universities and colleges in Kyoto Prefecture
1989 establishments in Japan